Saliou Guindo (born 12 September 1996) is a Malian professional footballer who plays as a forward for KF Laçi and the Mali national team.

Club career
Guindo began his professional club career at Jeanne d'Arc FC in 2014 and played until 2015. He later signed with ASEC Mimosas in the Ligue 1 (Ivory Coast).

In 2015, he moved to Tunisian side Espérance Sportive de Tunis. He has also appeared in 4 CAF Confederation Cup matches with Espérance. Guindo later played for Kategoria Superiore side KF Skënderbeu Korçë from 2018 to 2019.

In the 2017-18 season, he featured for Al-Ahli Manama in the Bahrain top flight and Albanian club KF Skënderbeu then came calling in the season that followed. Between 2018 and 2020, the striker featured for them and later FK Bylis Ballsh in the Albanian first division, before he was signed by the Turkish tier two club Ankara Keciörengücü.

Domestically he has also played in another Kategoria Superiore side FK Byllis Ballsh. In the 2019–20 Kategoria Superiore, he emerged as the top scorer with 11 goals and 3 assists for FK Byllis Ballsh. It was Guindo's best performance so far.

In 2020, he went to Turkey and signed a three year contract with TFF 1st League outfit Ankara Keçiörengücü SK but has not appeared in league games.

Gokulam Kerala
On 21 November 2020, it was announced that I-League outfit Gokulam Kerala FC have completed the signing of Saliou Guindo. “Saliou Guindo has signed for Gokulam Kerala on a season-long deal,” a source close to the developments informed Khel Now. Guindo and the Malabarians have mutually agreed terms on a season-long deal until the end of the 2020-21 season.

On 1 January 2021, Guindo has also appeared in the squad of Gokulam Kerala B, which competes in the Kerala Premier League.

International career
Born in a town named Ségou, Guindo represented his country at the FIFA U20 World Cup in 2015, where they secured the 3rd position.

Guindo was eyeing to win the tournament for making Mali proud around the world. In his words, "It's our dream to win this competition." Guindo added : "Our country would be known around the world. Many countries don't know about us and many people sometimes ask us, 'what's Mali?'"

He has also represented his nation in 2015 Africa U-20 Cup of Nations, where they finished 4th. Guindo was the man behind his country's qualification in the tournament.

Guindo was called up in the squad of Mali national football team in 2020 but he is still searching his debut match for the senior team. He debuted with the Mali national team in a 1–0 2022 World Cup qualification loss to Tunisia on 25 March 2022.

Career statistics

Club

Notes

Honours
Espérance Tunis
Tunisian Ligue Professionnelle 1: 2016–17, 2017–18

KF Bylis
Kategoria e Parë: 2018–19

Gokulam Kerala
Kerala Premier League: 2021–21

Mali U20
FIFA U-20 World Cup: third place 2015
African U-20 Championship: Fourth place 2015

Individual
Kerala Premier League top scorer: 2020–21 (with 8 goals)
Kategoria Superiore top scores : 2021–22 (with 19 goals)

See also
 List of Malian expatriate footballers

References

External links
 Saliou Guindo profile and career stats at sofascore

1996 births
Living people
People from Ségou
Malian footballers
Association football forwards
Mali international footballers
Mali under-20 international footballers
Malian Première Division players
Tunisian Ligue Professionnelle 1 players
Bahraini Premier League players
Kategoria Superiore players
I-League players
UAE Pro League players
AS Bamako players
ASEC Mimosas players
Espérance Sportive de Tunis players
Al-Ahli Club (Manama) players
KF Skënderbeu Korçë players
KF Bylis Ballsh players
Ankara Keçiörengücü S.K. footballers
Gokulam Kerala FC players
KF Laçi players
Dibba FC players
Malian expatriate footballers
Malian expatriate sportspeople in Ivory Coast
Expatriate footballers in Ivory Coast
Malian expatriate sportspeople in Tunisia
Expatriate footballers in Tunisia
Expatriate footballers in Bahrain
Malian expatriate sportspeople in Albania
Expatriate footballers in Albania
Malian expatriate sportspeople in Turkey
Expatriate footballers in Turkey
Malian expatriate sportspeople in India
Expatriate footballers in India
Malian expatriate sportspeople in the United Arab Emirates
Expatriate footballers in the United Arab Emirates
21st-century Malian people